Su Yiming (born 18 February 2004) is a Chinese snowboarder, an Olympic champion and former child actor. By winning the 2021–22 FIS Snowboard World Cup Big Air event at Steamboat Ski Resort on 4 December 2021, he became the first Chinese snowboarder to take a World Cup podium position.

Su is recognized as the first snowboarder to complete and land the 1980-degree aerial spin successfully.

2022 Winter Olympics
He competed at the 2022 Winter Olympics and was the only competitor to achieve an 1800-degree aerial in the men's slopestyle event, winning a silver medal, making him the second Chinese athlete after Liu Jiayu to win an Olympic medal in snowboarding. The silver was controversial however, as confounded fans said Su was "robbed" by the low judging scores in spite of his unprecedented performances, and also due to the judges missing a glaring error made by gold medalist Max Parrot of Canada  after judges fail to see him grab his knee rather than his board during the men's slopestyle final. British expert Ed Leigh wrote in the BBC, "The judges have put execution at such a premium that something like that should have cost him two or three points. So the gold has gone wrong there. ... I think Su Yiming actually took the gold there. This is a mistake on the judges' part." Iztok Sumatic, chief judge at the Olympics, admitted that judges failed to pick up on the mistake by Parrot in his second run due to not being given the camera angles of viewers. He also likened it to Diego Maradona's "Hand of God" refereeing mistake. However, Parrot, acknowledged the error but still felt like he had the most technical run and deserved his gold medal. 

At the 2022 Winter Olympics in Beijing, Su was the only competitor to achieve an 1800-degree aerial in the men's slopestyle event, winning a silver medal, making him the second Chinese athlete after Liu Jiayu to win an Olympic medal in snowboarding. 

A week following the slopestyle event, Su won the gold medal in the Big Air event with a score of 182.50 by completing a front-side 1800 and a back-side triple-cork 1800 in his first and second runs respectively, and edging out Mons Røisland who won silver while Max Parrot grabbed the bronze medal. In doing so, 17-year-old Su became the first Chinese to win a gold medal in this event and celebrated his 18th birthday four days later.

Filmography

Film
The Taking of Tiger Mountain (2014) as Jiang Shuanzi
Rock Kid (摇滚小子, 2018) as Baobei

TV series
Tracks in the Snowy Forest (林海雪原, 2017) as Shui An
A Splendid Life in Beijing (生逢灿烂的日子, 2017) as Young Guo Xiaohai
The Wolf (2020) as Young Zhao Liuye

References

2004 births
Living people
Chinese male snowboarders
Olympic snowboarders of China
Snowboarders at the 2022 Winter Olympics
Medalists at the 2022 Winter Olympics
Olympic gold medalists for China
Olympic silver medalists for China
Olympic medalists in snowboarding
Chinese male child actors
21st-century Chinese male actors
Chinese male film actors
People from Jilin City
Male actors from Jilin
Chinese male television actors